Ancarista is a monotypic moth genus of the family Noctuidae erected by Karl Jordan in 1921. Its only species, Ancarista laminifera, was first described by Saalmüller in 1878. It is found on Madagascar and the Comoros.

Taxonomy
The Global Lepidoptera Names Index gives this name as a synonym of Paratuerta Hampson, 1902.

References

Agaristinae
Noctuoidea genera
Monotypic moth genera